The 1907 International Cross Country Championships took place on 23 March 1907. The race was held at the Glasgow Agricultural Society Show Grounds, Scotstoun in Glasgow, Scotland. It was the first year that athletes from France competed in the event. Race results, and medallists were published in the Glasgow Herald.

Participation
According to an unofficial count, 56 athletes participated from five countries:

 (12)
 (10)
 (10)
 (12)
 (12)

Medallists

Individual Race Results

Men's (10 mi / 16.1 km)

Team Results

Men's

See also
 1907 in athletics (track and field)

References

International Cross Country Championships
International Cross Country Championships
International Cross Country Championships
International Cross Country Championships
Cross
Cross
Cross country running in the United Kingdom
1900s in Glasgow